Plau am See is an Amt in the Ludwigslust-Parchim district, in Mecklenburg-Vorpommern, Germany. The seat of the Amt is in Plau am See.

The Amt Plau am See consists of the following municipalities:
 Barkhagen
 Ganzlin
 Plau am See

References

Ämter in Mecklenburg-Western Pomerania